"Anecdote of Men by the Thousand" is a poem from Wallace Stevens's first book of poetry, Harmonium (1923). It was first published prior to 1923 and is therefore in the public domain, according to Librivox.

Interpretation
Stevens recognized that his poems were a visible expression of (an invisible element of) his North American place. This would remain true even if the poet were to succeed in overcoming locality, as Crispin attempts to do in "The Comedian as the Letter C". The opening stanza is a dramatic statement about the soul's being composed of the external world, an idea approached philosophically by American philosophers like Charles Sanders Peirce. Compare Theory.

The next lines in the poem are anticipatory assertions, and then two leading questions, and finally a blossoming of the poem's idea in the image of a woman of Lhassa.  That interpretation overlooks that the "idea" is expressed as reported speech, however, and fails to identify who "he" is (it is naively assumed to be the poet).

Notes

References 

 Peirce, C.S. Collected Papers of Charles Sanders Peirce, vols. 7–8, Arthur Burks (ed.). 1958:  Harvard University Press.

1923 poems
American poems
Poetry by Wallace Stevens